The Brave Enough Tour was a worldwide concert tour by violinist Lindsey Stirling in support of her third album Brave Enough.

Background
The tour began in North America in 2016, across 35 dates before heading to Europe for early 2017. Stirling then toured venues in Australia and New Zealand before returning to both North and South America.

The Brave Enough tour was Stirling's first world tour without Jason Gaviati, her long term keyboard player, who died in late 2015.

A documentary called Lindsey Stirling: Brave Enough was produced and filmed whilst Stirling was on tour. It was broadcast as paid streaming content on YouTube having been produced by YouTubeRed.

Set list
The following set list is representative of the show in London on April 3, 2017.

 "The Phoenix"
 "Love's Just a Feeling"
 "Prism"
 "Shatter Me"
 "Lost Girls"
 "Elements"
 "Mini Set (acoustic)"
 "Something Wild"
 "Gavi's Song"
 "Those Days"
 "Crystallize"
 "Hold My Heart"
 "The Arena"
 "Mirage"
 "Stars Align"

Encore
 "Roundtable Rival / Don't Let This Feeling Fade"

Tour dates

Personnel
Band
 Lindsey Stirling – violin
 Drew Steen – drums, percussion
 Kit Nolan – keyboards, guitars and samples

References

External links
Official website

2016 concert tours
2017 concert tours
Lindsey Stirling concert tours